This is a list of anime songs from the Dragon Ball franchise which have bene released as singles.

TV series

Dragon Ball 
"Makafushigi Adventure!" (1986)
"Romantic Ageru yo" (1986)

Dragon Ball Z 
"Cha-La Head-Cha-La" (1989)
"Detekoi Tobikiri ZENKAI Power!" (1989)
"We Gotta Power" (1993)
"We Were Angels" (1993)

Dragon Ball GT 
"Dan Dan Kokoro Hikarete 'ku" (1996)
"Hitori ja Nai" (1996)
"Don't You See!" (1997)
"Blue Velvet" (1997)
"Sabitsuita Machine Gun de Ima o Uchinukō" (1997)

Dragon Ball Kai 
"Dragon Soul" (2009)
"Yeah! Break! Care! Break!" (2009)
"Kokoro no Hane" (2010)
"Kuu•Zen•Zetsu•Go" (2014)
"Dear Zarathustra" (2014)
"Junjō" (2014)
"Oh Yeah!!!!!!!" (2014)
"Galaxy" (2015)
"Don't Let Me Down" (2015)

Dragon Ball Super 
"Chōzetsu Dynamic!" (2015)
"Hello Hello Hello" (2015)
"Starring Star" (2015)
"Usubeni" (2016)
"Forever Dreaming" (2016)
"Yokayoka Dance" (2016)
"Chao Han Music" (2016)
"Aku no Tenshi to Seigi no Akuma" (2017)
"Genkai Toppa × Survivor" (2017)
"Boogie Back" (2017)
"Haruka" (2017)
"70cm Shiho no Madobe" (2017)
"Lagrima" (2018)

Video games 
"Kusuburu Heart Ni Hi Wo Tsukero!!" (2005)
"Ore wa Tokoton Tomaranai!!" (2005)
"Hikari no Sasu Mirai e!" (2008)
"Power of Dreamer" (2009)
"Progression" (2009)
"Battle of Omega" (2010)

Film

Anime
"Kiseki no Big Fight" (1994)
"Dragon Power ∞" (1994)
"Saikyō no Fusion" (1995)
"Ore ga Yaranakya Dare ga Yaru" (1995)
"Hero (Kibō no Uta)" (2013)

Live action
"Rule" (2009)

References

Dragon Ball
Singles